Tales of Ordinary Madness is a 1981 film by Italian director Marco Ferreri. It was shot in English in the United States, featuring Ben Gazzara and Ornella Muti in the leading roles. The film's title and subject matter are based on the works and the person of US poet Charles Bukowski, including the short story The Most Beautiful Woman in Town (published by City Lights Publishing in the 1972 collection Erections, Ejaculations, Exhibitions, and General Tales of Ordinary Madness).

The film's protagonist, Charles Serking, is based on Bukowski's autobiographical character Henry Chinaski. At the time, the director Taylor Hackford owned the rights to the Chinaski name, having acquired them when he optioned Bukowski's 1971 novel Post Office.

Plot
The film follows the meandering (sexual) adventures of the poet and drunk, Charles Serking, laying bare the sleaze of life in the less reputable neighborhoods of Los Angeles. Serking's life takes a turn for the better when he meets Cass, a young hooker with self destructive habits. They have a stormy relationship. When Serking gets an offer from a major publishing house, Cass tries to stop him from leaving, but fails. Serking gives in to the temptation of the big bucks, but soon realises his mistake and returns to L.A only to find that Cass has killed herself in his absence. Devastated he hits the bottle in a nightmarish drinking bout, but finally reaches catharsis and returns to the seaside guesthouse where he spent his happiest moments with Cass. Here he rekindles his poetry with the aid of a young admirer in one of Ferreri's trademark beach scenes.

Reception
While successful in Europe, the film met with a lukewarm reception in the US despite its American setting. Janet Maslin of the New York Times gave the film a negative review.

Awards 
The film won 4 David di Donatello and  2 Nastro d'Argento both including Best Director.

David di Donatello
Marco Ferreri: Best Director
Sergio Amidei & Marco Ferreri: Best Script
Tonino Delli Colli - Best Cinematography
Ruggero Mastroianni - Best Editing

References

External links 
 

1981 films
1981 drama films
Italian drama films
Films based on works by Charles Bukowski
Films set in Los Angeles
Films shot in Los Angeles
Films about prostitution in the United States
Films about alcoholism
Films directed by Marco Ferreri
Films scored by Philippe Sarde
Films set in the United States
Films based on short fiction
French drama films
English-language French films
English-language Italian films
1980s English-language films
1980s Italian films
1980s French films